Boer or Boers or variation, may refer to:

People
 Boers, Dutch settlers of South Africa, who became the Afrikaaners
 Boer (surname), a Dutch surname meaning "Farmer"; including "Boers", "Boeres", and variations
 Boer Chen (1907–1951), Chinese actress

Places
 Boer, Waadhoeke, Friesland, Netherlands; a village
 Boer, Virginia, USA; an unincorporated community

Other uses
 Boer War (disambiguation)
 Boer goat, a type of goat
 Boer pony, a type of pony

See also

 De Boer (surname)